Prionella villosa is a species of ulidiid or picture-winged fly in the genus Prionella of the family Tephritidae.

References

Ulidiidae